Robert Louis Gaillard (born October 23, 1940) is an American former college basketball coach and businessman. He coached the San Francisco Dons as an assistant beginning in 1968, and became head coach in the 1970–71 season. Under Gaillard, the Dons finished 29–2 in the 1976–77 season, which saw them ranked number one in the nation for much of the year.  In 1977 he was recognized as the Associated Press College Basketball Coach of the Year.

After leaving San Francisco, Gaillard worked for several years in the private sector, becoming director of sales and advertising for the San Francisco Giants in 1981.

He was the men's basketball head coach at Lewis & Clark College from 1989 to 2011.  He was succeeded by Dinari Foreman. The Pioneers gave Gaillard his 500th career victory in 2009.

He is a 1958 graduate of Harry Ells High School in Richmond, California.

Head coaching record

References

1940 births
Living people
American men's basketball players
Basketball coaches from California
Basketball players from California
College men's basketball head coaches in the United States
Lewis & Clark Pioneers men's basketball coaches
San Francisco Dons athletic directors
San Francisco Dons men's basketball coaches
San Francisco Dons men's basketball players
San Francisco Giants executives
Sportspeople from Richmond, California